Mount Lindesay Highway is an Australian national highway located in Queensland. For most of its length it is roughly aligned with the Sydney–Brisbane rail corridor. At its southern end these transport routes take different passes over the Scenic Rim into the Northern Rivers region. It is designated National Route 13.

Route
Mount Lindesay Highway commences at the intersection with Ipswich Road in Moorooka and heads in a southerly direction sign-posted as Beaudesert Road, through Brisbane's southern suburban fringes, where it then crosses Logan Motorway. It continues south sign-posted as Mount Lindesay Highway through Jimboomba and Beaudesert, and onwards through the Scenic Rim region through Rathdowney, where the northern end of Lions Road tourist drive begins. South of Rathdowney the highway becomes very winding as it climbs the McPherson Range passing Mount Chinghee National Park, Mount Barney National Park and Border Ranges National Park on the way. The highway officially ends at the state border with New South Wales, where it continues south eventually to Casino and Grafton as Summerland Way.

History

Until the 1950s, the highway formed part of the main traffic route between Brisbane and Sydney. The coastal route (now the Pacific Highway) was not favoured due to the large number of ferry crossings of the wide coastal rivers, the frequency and severity of flooding of these rivers and the consequent poor state of much of the road for extended periods, and its steep, winding nature as it crossed the intermediate hills between each river valley. 

The passing of the Main Roads Act of 1924 through the Parliament of New South Wales provided for the declaration of Main Roads, roads partially funded by the State government through the Main Roads Board (later the Department of Main Roads, and eventually Transport for NSW). Great Northern Highway was declared (as Main Road No. 9) on 8 August 1928, running from North Sydney via Hornsby, Peat's Ferry, Gosford, Swansea, Newcastle, Maitland, Singleton, Tamworth, Armidale, Glen Innes, Tenterfield and Woodenbong to the border with Queensland; with the passing of the Main Roads (Amendment) Act of 1929 to provide for additional declarations of State Highways and Trunk Roads, this was amended to State Highway 9 on 8 April 1929. This was renamed New England Highway, through Queensland on 14 February 1933, and a month later through New South Wales on 14 March 1933, running from Hexham, Maitland, Singleton, Tamworth, Armidale, Glen Innes, Tenterfield, Woodenbong and Beaudesert to Brisbane.

In November 1949, a sealed road was opened through Cunninghams Gap, linking south-western Brisbane to Warwick, to eventually supplant the route via Mount Lindesay as the main Brisbane-Sydney traffic route as far south as Tenterfield. As a result, New England Highway was re-routed through Warwick along the route that was then known in Queensland as the Lockyer-Darling Downs Highway on 11 August 1954. Against the wishes of the Beaudesert Shire Council and the Woodenbong Chamber of Commerce, the former alignment of New England Highway from Tenterfield through Beaudesert to Brisbane was re-declared Mount Lindesay Highway, after Mount Lindesay, the residue of a solidified magma core, that is part of the Mount Warning volcanic area and is situated in the western extreme of Border Ranges National Park. The NSW Department of Main Roads (which had succeeded the New South Wales MRB in 1932), declared the New South Wales section as State Highway 24, from Tenterfield via Legume and Woodenbong to the state border with Queensland.

The New South Wales section of Mount Lindesay Highway, which still included unsealed portions, was eventually de-gazetted as a highway by NSW Department of Main Roads on 23 December 1981 due to very low traffic volumes, it was renamed Mount Lindesay Road and re-declared as Main Road 622. This left the Queensland section as the only surviving part of the highway. Within New South Wales, Summerland Way was consequently extended north 9.4km along the alignment of the former highway to meet the Queensland end of the highway at the state border, and the eastern end of Mount Lindesay Road was truncated at the intersection with Summerland Way just east of Woodenbong.

Between 2007 and 2009  of the highway in the Logan City local government area was upgraded. As well as providing dual carriageways, the work included building service roads so that local traffic does not have to travel on the main carriageways, thereby reducing congestion.

Upgrades

Projects

Towns and Localities on the Mount Lindesay Highway (QLD) & Mount Lindesay Road (NSW)
From north to south, the following towns, suburbs and localities are either bounded by or passed through by the Mount Lindesday Highway and Mount Lindesay Road respectively:

 Moorooka — commences in  Brisbane City (through)
 Salisbury (through and boundary)
 Rocklea (through and boundary)
 Coopers Plains (boundary)
 Archerfield (boundary)
 Acacia Ridge (through and boundary)
 Sunnybank Hills (boundary)
 Algester (boundary)
 Calamvale (through and boundary)
 Parkinson (boundary)
 Drewvale (boundary)
 Browns Plains — crosses into Logan City (boundary)

 Hillcrest (boundary)
 Regents Park  (boundary)
 Boronia Heights (boundary)
 Park Ridge (through and boundary)
 Greenbank (boundary)
 Park Ridge South (through and boundary)
 Munruben (through and boundary)
 North Maclean (through)
 South Maclean (through and boundary)
 Jimboomba (through and boundary)
 Cedar Grove (through and boundary)
 Cedar Vale (boundary)
 Woodhill (through)
 Veresdale — (through), boundary between  Logan City and Scenic Rim Region

 Gleneagle — Scenic Rim Region (through) 
 Beaudesert (through and boundary)
 Cryna (boundary)
 Josephville (through)
 Laravale (through and boundary)
 Tamrookum (through and boundary)
 Innisplain (through and boundary)
 Tamrookum Creek (boundary)
 Rathdowney (through)
 Palen Creek (through)
 Mount Barney (boundary)
 Mount Lindesay (through and boundary)
 Woodenbong, New South Wales (through)
 Koreelah, New South Wales (through)
 Legume, New South Wales (through)
 Lower Acacia Creek, New South Wales (through)
 Cullendore, New South Wales (through)
 Wylie Creek, New South Wales (through)
 Liston, New South Wales (through)
 Amosfield, New South Wales (through)
 Willsons Downfall, New South Wales (through)
 Bookookoorara, New South Wales (through)
 Carrolls Creek, New South Wales (through)
 Boonoo Boonoo, New South Wales (through)
 Tenterfield, New South Wales (through and boundary)

Major intersections

Gallery

See also

 Highways in Australia
 List of highways in Queensland

References

External links

 Mt Lindesay Highway, ozroads

Highways in Australia
Highways in Queensland
South East Queensland
Northern Rivers